WGHC may refer to:

 WGHC-LP, a defunct low-power radio station (98.3 FM) formerly licensed to serve Chicago, Illinois, United States
 WGHC (defunct), a defunct radio station (1400 AM) formerly licensed to serve Clayton, Georgia, United States
 WGHC (FM), a defunct radio station (91.7 FM) formerly licensed to serve Tallulah Falls, Georgia
 WTCG, a radio station (870 AM) licensed to serve Mount Holly, North Carolina, United States, which held the call sign WGHC from 1946 to 2009